Sophia Schaller (born 17 September 2000) is an Austrian figure skater. She is the 2018 Sarajevo Open champion, the 2019 Santa Claus Cup bronze medalist, and a five-time Austrian national medalist.

On the junior level, she is the 2016 Santa Claus Cup silver medalist and the 2017 Austrian junior national silver medalist.

Competitive highlights 
CS: Challenger Series; JGP: Junior Grand Prix

Pairs with Mayr

Womens' Singles

Detailed results 
Small medals for short and free programs awarded only at ISU Championships.

Senior results

Junior results

References

External links
 

Living people
2000 births
Sportspeople from Salzburg
Austrian female single skaters